William Rennie Miller (19 January 1910 – 20 February 1978) was a Scottish professional footballer who played as an inside forward. He was nicknamed 'Golden Miller', after a famous racehorse of the time.

References

Sources

1910 births
1978 deaths
Footballers from Falkirk (council area)
Scottish footballers
Association football inside forwards
Partick Thistle F.C. players
Everton F.C. players
Burnley F.C. players
Scottish Junior Football Association players
Airdrieonians F.C. (1878) wartime guest players
Falkirk F.C. players
Dumbarton F.C. players
Tranmere Rovers F.C. players
English Football League players
Scottish Football League players
Scottish Football League representative players
Alva Albion Rangers F.C. players